Margarette Ballard (20 December 1866 – unknown) was an American tennis player from the end of the 19th century. 

In 1889, she won the first women's doubles at the U.S. Women's National Championship with Bertha Townsend.

Grand Slam finals

Doubles (1 title, 1 runners-up)

References

1866 births
Year of death missing
19th-century American women
19th-century female tennis players
American female tennis players
United States National champions (tennis)
Grand Slam (tennis) champions in women's doubles